Williston  is a town in Barnwell County, South Carolina, United States.  The population was 3,139 at the 2010 census.

The town lies in the center of the Charleston-Hamburg railroad line, the line of the Best Friend locomotive. The train tracks were removed in the 1990s, but the track site has been designated as historically significant by the South Carolina Department of Archives. This section of the train route is now part of the South Carolina Heritage Corridor.

History
The Ashley-Willis House was listed on the National Register of Historic Places in 2004.

Geography
U.S. Route 78 passes through the center of the town, leading east  to Blackville and northwest  to Aiken.

Demographics

2020 census

As of the 2020 United States census, there were 2,877 people, 1,296 households, and 607 families residing in the town.

2000 census
As of the census of 2000, there were 3,307 people, 1,310 households, and 906 families residing in the town. The population density was 371.7 people per square mile (143.5/km2). There were 1,460 housing units at an average density of 164.1 per square mile (63.3/km2). The racial makeup of the town was 50.80% White, 47.51% African American, 0.36% Native American, 0.09% Pacific Islander, 0.21% from other races, and 1.03% from two or more races. Hispanic or Latino people of any race were 0.82% of the population.

There were 1,310 households, out of which 33.4% had children under the age of 18 living with them, 41.1% were married couples living together, 24.3% had a female householder with no husband present, and 30.8% were non-families. 27.8% of all households were made up of individuals, and 12.3% had someone living alone who was 65 years of age or older. The average household size was 2.48 and the average family size was 3.02.

In the town, the population was spread out, with 28.0% under the age of 18, 9.1% from 18 to 24, 25.9% from 25 to 44, 21.3% from 45 to 64, and 15.6% who were 65 years of age or older. The median age was 36 years. For every 100 females, there were 86.9 males. For every 100 females age 18 and over, there were 77.3 males.

The median income for a household in the town was $26,371, and the median income for a family was $30,990. Males had a median income of $27,829 versus $21,635 for females. The per capita income for the town was $15,134. About 26.3% of families and 24.4% of the population were below the poverty line, including 31.3% of those under age 18 and 23.5% of those age 65 or over.

Education
There are three schools in the town: Williston-Elko High School, Williston-Elko Middle School, and Kelly Edwards Elementary School. A private school in Blackville, Jefferson-Davis Academy, also serves a portion of the town's population.

Williston has a public library, a branch of the ABBE Regional Library System.

Notable people
 Rafael Bush, National Football League (NFL) safety, Buffalo Bills
 Taylor Hearn, NFL Offensive Guard, Carolina Panthers

References

External links
 Town of Williston official website

Towns in Barnwell County, South Carolina
Towns in South Carolina